Eglantine may refer to:

People 
 Fabre d'Églantine (1750–1794), French actor, dramatist, and politician of the French Revolution
 Eglantyne Jebb (1876–1928), British social reformer and founder of the Save the Children charity
 Eglantyne Louisa Jebb (1845–1925), Irish social reformer and mother of Eglantyne Jebb
 Eglantine Rembauville (born 1981), French actress

Fictional characters 
 Madame Eglantine, main character from The Prioress's Tale
 Eglantine, from the Guardians of Ga'Hoole series
 Eglantine Price, from the 1971 film Bedknobs and Broomsticks
 Eglantine Took, née Banks, mother of Pippin Took
 Eglantine von Puiset, a character in the  Carl Maria von Weber opera Euryanthe

Other 
 "Eglantine" (song), from the 1971 musical film Bedknobs and Broomsticks
 Eglantine rose (Rosa rubiginosa), also "Sweet briar"
 De Egelantier (the Eglantine Rose), a chamber of rhetoric of Medieval and Renaissance Amsterdam
 , formerly Eglantine, a Design 1105 cargo ship

See also